Céline Oopa was a French Polynesian politician. She was elected to the Territorial Assembly in 1961, becoming its first female member.

Biography
Oopa's husband Tautu was elected to the Territorial Assembly in 1953 and was re-elected in 1957. After his death in 1961, Céline contested the by-election on 8 October and was elected to the Assembly, becoming its first female member. She was re-elected in 1962 as a member of the Democratic Rally of the Tahitian People (RDPT). When the RDPT was dissolved in 1963, she was prevented from joining its successor, Here Ai'a. She remained a member of the Assembly until the 1967 elections.

References

Members of the Assembly of French Polynesia
French Polynesian women in politics
Democratic Rally of the Tahitian People politicians